The 2018 Basilan Steel season is the 1st season of the franchise in the Maharlika Pilipinas Basketball League (MPBL).

Key dates
 June 12, 2018: Regular Season Begins.

Current roster

Datu Cup

Standings

Game log

|- style="background:#fcc;"
| 1
| June 19
| Makati
| L 65–77
| Jercules Tangkay (16)
| Cris Dumapig (10)
| Jercules Tangkay (5)
| Bulacan Capitol Gymnasium
| 0–1
|- style="background:#fcc;"
| 2
| June 30
| @ Valenzuela
| L 94–96
| Ferdinand Lusdoc (24)
| John Julien Foronda (9)
| Clark Daniel Bautista (6)
| Valenzuela Astrodome
| 0–2

|- style="background:#bfb;"
| 3
| July 12
| Cebu City
| W 86–76
| Dennis Daa (25)
| Belorio, Mondragon (6)
| Jercules Tangkay (5)
| Strike Gymnasium
| 1–2
|- style="background:#bfb;"
| 4
| July 25
| Pampanga
| W 88–78
| Dennis Daa (17)
| Jonathan Belorio (11)
| Clark Daniel Bautista (6)
| Bulacan Capitol Gymnasium
| 2–2

|- style="background:#fcc;"
| 5
| August 16
| Pasay
| L 66–69
| Jercules Tangkay (16)
| John Julien Foronda (13)
| Clark Daniel Bautista (5)
| San Andres Sports Complex
| 2–3
|- style="background:#bfb;"
| 6
| August 28
| Caloocan
| W 92–84
| Dennis Daa (25)
| Daa, Mondragon (9)
| Clark Daniel Bautista (7)
| Bulacan Capitol Gymnasium
| 3–3

References

Basilan Steel Season, 2018